This is a list of all songs performed by the British pop girl group Girls Aloud.

Original songs

Covers

Live songs 
 "Apologize" – Jo Whiley's Live Lounge, 2008
 "Beneath Your Beautiful" – Radio 1 Live Lounge, 2012
 "Broken Strings" – Out of Control Tour, 2009
 "Call Me Maybe" – Ten: The Hits Tour, 2013
 "Celebration" – Children in Need, 2004
 "Fame" / "What a Feeling" / "Footloose" (Musicals Medley) – Chemistry Tour, 2006
 "I Predict a Riot" – Chemistry Tour, 2006 (available on The Sound of Girls Aloud rarities bonus disc)
 "Do You Love Me" / "She's Like the Wind" / "(I've Had) The Time of My Life" (Dirty Dancing Medley) – The Sound of Girls Aloud: The Greatest Hits Tour, 2007
 "Push It" – Tangled Up Tour, 2008
 "Rehab" – Jo Whiley's Live Lounge, 2006 (available on "Call the Shots" CD1)
 "Santa Claus Is Coming to Town" – Friday Night Project Christmas special, 2007
 "With Every Heartbeat" – Jo Whiley's Live Lounge, 2007 (available on "Can't Speak French" CD2) / Tangled Up Tour, 2008
 "Womanizer" – Out of Control Tour, 2009
 "You're The One That I Want" – Greasemaina, 2003

Unreleased songs
These songs were recorded by Girls Aloud, but remain unreleased.

"All I Ever Do" (COOPER/Brian Higgins/POWELL/ Nick Coler/WOODS/AFFERS)
"Little Drops of Heaven" (LEE S/LOWIS N/Paul Meehan)
"Out of Control" (Sound of the Underground sessions)
"Beautiful Villain" (COOPER/Brian Higgins/POWELL/ Nick Coler/Shaw) 
"Our Lips Are Sealed" (The Go-Go's)
"Shame" (Hannah Robinson, Andrew Watkins, Paul Wilson)
"Heartstrings" (COOPER/Brian Higgins/POWELL/ Nick Coler/Shaw/GIRLS ALOUD)
"Sorry" (Alana Hood, John McLaughlin, Sarah Osuji, Stephen Robson, Hannah Thompson)
"Where Did The Love Go?" (Girls Aloud, Brian Higgins)
"Wicked Game" (Chris Isaak)
"Sleeping With Sirens" (COOPER/Brian Higgins/POWELL/ Nick Coler/Shaw)
"Bored Stupid" (Tangled Up sessions)
"What A Feeling" (originally taken from The Sound of Girls Aloud: The Greatest Hits)

See also 

 Girls Aloud discography
 List of awards and nominations received by Girls Aloud
 List of Girls Aloud concert tours
 List of best-selling girl groups

Footnotes 

A ^  A drastically different demo version of "Love Machine" appears on Popjustice: 100% Solid Pop Music.
B ^  Appears in CD form on the rarities disc of The Sound of Girls Aloud.
C ^  Outtake from the Chemistry sessions.
D ^  An alternate demo of "Wake Me Up" appears on the rarities disc of The Sound of Girls Aloud.
E ^  Later appeared on the re-issue of Sound of the Underground.
F ^  From ITV1's Greasemania.
G ^  Later appeared on What Will the Neighbours Say?
H ^  Backing vocals for Franz Ferdinand.
I ^  Collaboration with Sugababes.
J ^  Performed with James Morrison himself at The Girls Aloud Party.

References

External links 
Official website
 
 

 
Girls Aloud
Girls Aloud